On November 6, 2001, the owners of the 30 teams in Major League Baseball (MLB) voted 28–2 to eliminate two teams for the 2002 season. The two teams expected to be eliminated, the Minnesota Twins and the Montreal Expos, cast the dissenting votes. According to Commissioner Bud Selig, the decision was made due to economic reasons, as "the teams to be contracted [had] a long record of failing to generate enough revenues to operate a viable major league franchise." Also factoring into the contraction plan was the two teams' inability to fund the construction of new ballparks to replace the outdated Hubert H. Humphrey Metrodome and Olympic Stadium.

The contraction plan fell through due to a court injunction compelling the Twins to honor their lease with the Metrodome, as well as challenges by the players' labor union, the Major League Baseball Players Association (MLBPA). The Expos were later purchased by Major League Baseball. The Twins would eventually secure funding for a new stadium that opened in 2010, while the Expos relocated to Washington, D.C. in 2005 and were re-branded the Washington Nationals, later being purchased by Ted Lerner and moving to a new stadium of their own.

If the plan had gone through, it would have been the first contraction by a major North American professional sports league since the National Hockey League merged the Cleveland Barons into the Minnesota North Stars in 1978, and the first contraction by Major League Baseball since 1899.

Background

Minnesota Twins
The Minnesota Twins began playing at the Metrodome in the 1982 season after playing for 21 seasons at Metropolitan Stadium. Nevertheless, the multipurpose stadium, which the Twins shared with the Minnesota Vikings of the National Football League, had poor sightlines when the field was set for baseball, and the Twins received no revenue from signage, luxury suites, or parking. Additionally, the white, air-supported roof not only caused many fielders to have trouble tracking fly balls, but it also deflated due to heavy snow on numerous occasions.

By the start of the 1990s, the Metrodome was already considered obsolete. During the 1990s and early 2000s, the Twins were often rumored to be moving to such places as Sacramento, California; Orlando, Florida; Nashville, Tennessee; and others in search of a more financially competitive market. In 1997, the team came close to an agreement to move to North Carolina, but the deal was not completed.

There was also some speculation that Selig targeted the Twins because of his family's ownership of the Milwaukee Brewers, the next closest team to the Twin Cities, and which was set to potentially gain the Twins' market should the team be dissolved.

Montreal Expos
Olympic Stadium was originally constructed as a multipurpose venue for the 1976 Summer Olympics, which Montreal hosted. The Montreal Expos began playing full-time at the stadium in the 1977 season, one year after the stadium's opening and the team's ninth year of play. Although the new stadium was an upgrade from Jarry Park Stadium, Olympic Stadium was still fraught with problems. A retractable roof that was scheduled to be finished when the Expos moved in was not finished until 1987, and began to leak within only a few years. In 1991, support beams collapsed and a 55-ton slab of concrete crashed onto a walkway outside the stadium, forcing the Expos to play their final 13 home games that year on the road.

The stadium's poor conditions contributed to low attendance in Montreal. Throughout the 1990s, the Expos ranked near the bottom in the NL for attendance, including ranking last in each of their final seven seasons in Montreal. Owner Jeffrey Loria was unable to reach an agreement for television and English-speaking radio coverage to increase the team's broadcasting revenue, and his proposal for a new downtown ballpark was rebuffed by the Quebec government.

Owners vote for contraction
On November 6, 2001, the day before the active MLB labor agreement expired, MLB franchise owners met in Chicago to vote on contraction, despite earlier reports that no such vote would take place. The owners voted 28–2 in favor of contraction. Although the Florida Marlins, Tampa Bay Devil Rays and Oakland Athletics had been discussed as candidates for elimination, the Expos and Twins were considered the likeliest teams to be folded. The owners of both teams were set to receive $250 million buyouts to let MLB take control of and fold their franchises.

Aftermath
Major League Baseball Players Association (MLBPA) executive director Donald Fehr noted that the players' union had no say in the matter and called the decision "imprudent and unfortunate...We had hoped that we were in a new era, one that would see a much better relationship between players and owners. Today's announcement is a severe blow to such hopes." The MLBPA filed a grievance to block contraction the day after the vote. On November 16, the league's contraction plans were shelved when Hennepin County Judge Harry Crump ruled that the Minnesota Twins must honor their lease and play their final season at the Metrodome, citing the team's importance to the community. Had only the Expos been contracted, there would have been an odd number of teams in the two leagues, meaning one team would have to be idle every day. This would have made it all but impossible to preserve a 162-game schedule within the normal six-month season. 

By December 13, talks about contraction had ended, and on January 12, 2002, it was announced that no teams would be eliminated for the upcoming season.

On January 16, Loria sold the Expos to Major League Baseball for $120 million. MLB formed Expos Baseball L.P., a partnership of the other 29 clubs, to operate the Expos. Loria then bought the Florida Marlins from John W. Henry for $158 million, using the proceeds from the Expos sale plus a $38.5 million no-interest loan from MLB. Henry then bought the Boston Red Sox from the Yawkey Trust. It was officially announced on February 5 that plans for contraction had been abandoned. On August 30, the owners and players approved a new collective bargaining agreement that forbade contraction until 2006.

With no plans for a new ballpark in Montreal, Major League Baseball looked into relocating the Expos. Cities that expressed interest in the team included Washington, D.C.; Las Vegas, Nevada; Norfolk, Virginia; Monterrey, Nuevo León, Mexico; and Portland, Oregon. On September 29, 2004, Major League Baseball announced that the Expos would relocate to Washington, D.C. for the 2005 season. MLB owners voted 28–1 in favor of the move, with the Baltimore Orioles casting the lone dissenting vote. The team, re-branded as the Washington Nationals and being sold to Ted Lerner in 2006, played their first three seasons at Robert F. Kennedy Memorial Stadium before moving into the newly constructed Nationals Park in 2008.

On May 26, 2006, after years of failed proposals, Minnesota Governor Tim Pawlenty signed a bill that approved funding for a new $522 million ballpark, to which the Twins agreed to contribute $130 million. The new stadium, named Target Field, opened in April 2010.

References

Major League Baseball controversies
Contraction plan
Contraction plan
Minnesota Twins
Montreal Expos